Tamba E. Kaingbanja is a Sierra Leonean politician from the opposition Sierra Leone People's Party (SLPP). He is a member of the parliament of Sierra Leone, representing the Kono District. Kaingbaja is from the Kono ethnic group.

External links
http://www.slpp.ws/browse.asp?page=426 

Members of the Parliament of Sierra Leone
Living people
Sierra Leone People's Party politicians
Year of birth missing (living people)
Place of birth missing (living people)
People from Kono District